The Hartford Club is a private club at 46 Prospect Street in Hartford, Connecticut, founded in 1873.

History
The Hartford Club began as a union of local men's clubs amalgamated due to financial woes. It began admitting women members in the 1970s. Its present clubhouse, located at 46 Prospect Street, was designed in 1901 by Robert D. Andrews of Andrews, Jaques & Rantoul and was completed in 1903. It opened on January 1, 1908.

The club provides dining rooms, private banquet and meeting rooms, concierge services for members, and members' activities.

Architecture
The clubhouse is located in downtown Hartford, on the east side of Prospect Street, across from the Travelers Tower and one block south of the Old State House. It is a three-story Georgian Revival building, slightly larger in size than domestic mansions of the period that were built in a similar style.  It has a broad five-bay facade, with slightly projecting end bays.  The ground-floor end windows are three-part Palladian style windows with narrow sidelights, and the center entrance has a series of elaborate projecting elements supported by Corinthian columns.  Second-floor windows are set in openings with half-round tops set in recessed panels; the outer windows have the arched section filled with moulded decorative panels.

The clubhouse was listed on the National Register of Historic Places in 1984.

Notable members
 Oliver Butterworth
 Edmund Ernest Cammack
 Louis R. Cheney
 Wilbur L. Cross
 Dominick Dunne
 Richard Hartford
 Katharine Hepburn
 George Keller
 Senator Joseph Lieberman
 John Pierpont Morgan
 Igor Sikorsky
 Wallace Stevens
 Mark Twain

See also

 List of American gentlemen's clubs
 National Register of Historic Places listings in Hartford, Connecticut

References

External links

 Hartford Club (official website)

1873 establishments in Connecticut
Buildings and structures completed in 1903
Buildings and structures in Hartford, Connecticut
National Register of Historic Places in Hartford, Connecticut
Clubhouses in Connecticut
Clubs and societies in the United States
Colonial Revival architecture in Connecticut
Gentlemen's clubs in the United States
Clubhouses on the National Register of Historic Places in Connecticut